Garrha pudica is a moth of the family Oecophoridae. It is found Australia, where it has been described from the Australian Capital Territory, New South Wales and Queensland.

The wingspan is about 15 mm. Adults have pale brown wings, with one large, and two small dark spots near the middle of each forewing. The hindwings are silky pale brown.

The larvae live in a lenticular portable case of dead leaf material. They feed on dead leaves of Eucalyptus tereticornis.

External links
Australian Insects
Australian Faunal Directory

Moths described in 1855
Garrha